TOBB University of Economics and Technology is a private non-profit foundation university in Ankara, Turkey.

History 
Tobb University is a private non-profit cooperative education university established in 2003 by The Turkish Chambers and Commodity Exchanges Education and Culture Foundation, commonly known as “TOBEV” which is a unit that branches from The Union of Chambers and Commodity Exchanges of Turkey, which is the highest legal entity representing the private sector. However, admission for students did not occur until 2004 with three faculties and ten departments. With the later establishment of the Faculty of Fine Arts and Design in 2007 with its first set of students. Tobb University was founded on the premise of university and industry having strong ties, with a goal to prepare students for the business and science worlds. Tobb University has a strong focus on entrepreneurial opportunities, with a curriculum that offers cooperative education, which includes internships that count toward graduation.

Tobb University's first graduation ceremony took place in 2008, and then established the Faculty of Law in 2009.

In 2010, Tobb University opened a Student Guesthouse as an accommodation. In 2013, Tobb University established two more departments, which were the School of Medicine and the Technology Center. The inclusion of a new program known as “GARAGE”, which provides services to encourage students to bring forth their business ideas in practical applications in the real world under supervision.

Later in 2014, the Morphology Lab branched off from the School of Medicine and started operations at its own building.

Admission and fees 

As of 2019,
Undergraduate Turkish Students without scholarship have a tuition of 37,500 TRY

Graduate Turkish Students without scholarship have a tuition of 11,250 TRY

Undergraduate Foreign Students without scholarship have a tuition of $12,000 USD

Academic units

Faculties and departments
 Faculty of Engineering
 Department of Biomedical Engineering
 Department of Computer Engineering
 Department of Electrical and Electronics Engineering
 Department of Industrial Engineering
 Department of Materials Science and Nanotechnology
 Department of Mechanical Engineering
 Faculty of Economics and Administrative Sciences
 Department of Business Administration
 Department of Economics
 Department of International Entrepreneurship
 Department of International Relations
 Department of Political Science
Faculty of Science and Literature
Department of English Language and Literature
Department of History
Department of Mathematics
Department of Turkish Language and Literature
Department of Psychology
Faculty of Fine Arts
Department of Industrial Design
Department of Visual Communication Design
Department of Interior and Environmental Design
Department of Architecture
Department of Art and Design
Faculty of Law
Faculty of Medicine
Department of Foreign Languages

Institutes
Institute of Natural and Applied Sciences
Institute of Social Sciences

International establishments
Starting with the educational year of 2020–2021, TOBB ETU Tashkent Campus in  Uzbekistan will start accepting its first students.

Established as a non-state university under Tashkent State University of Economics, the campus will be offering undergraduate programs:
E-Commerce and Technology Management
International Business and Entrepreneurship

Student societies 
TOBB University of Economics and Technology houses 78 student societies, many of them with international affiliations. One such example would be SDG Student Hub of TOBB ETÜ, a SDSN Youth body working towards increasing awareness of the Sustainable Development Goals and providing students with tools to embrace sustainable practices.

See also 
 Education in Turkey
 List of universities in Turkey

References

 https://www.etu.edu.tr/en/duyuru/tobb-etu-tashkent-welcomes-first-students-this-fall

External links 
TOBB University of Economics and Technology
Library of TOBB ETU
Turkey's Union of Chambers and Commodity Exchanges (TOBB)

TOBB University of Economics and Technology
Private universities and colleges in Turkey
Educational institutions established in 2003
2003 establishments in Turkey